Himanshu Soni (born 1 February 1988) is an Indian actor. He is best known for his portrayal of Buddha in the series, Buddha-Rajaon Ka Raja.

Early life 
Soni was born on 1 February 1988 in Jaipur, Rajasthan, India. He married, Sheetal Singh, in the year 2015.

Soni signed up for RadhaKrishn in 2018.

Television

References

External links 
 

1988 births
Living people
Indian male television actors
21st-century Indian male actors